Michael Stoute (born 3 February 1948) is a Barbadian former cyclist. He competed in the individual road race at the 1968 Summer Olympics.

References

External links
 

1948 births
Living people
Barbadian male cyclists
Commonwealth Games competitors for Barbados
Cyclists at the 1966 British Empire and Commonwealth Games
Olympic cyclists of Barbados
Cyclists at the 1968 Summer Olympics